is a Japanese superhero manga series written and illustrated by Kōhei Horikoshi. It has been serialized in Shueisha's shōnen manga magazine Weekly Shōnen Jump since July 2014, with its chapters additionally collected into 37 tankōbon volumes as of February 2023. Set in a world where superpowers (called "Quirks") have become commonplace, the story follows Izuku Midoriya, a boy who was born without a Quirk but still dreams of becoming a superhero himself. He is scouted by All Might, Japan's greatest hero, who bestows his Quirk to Midoriya after recognizing his potential, and helps to enroll him in a prestigious high school for superheroes in training.

The manga spawned a media franchise, having inspired numerous spin-off manga, such as My Hero Academia: Smash!!, My Hero Academia: Vigilantes and My Hero Academia: Team-Up Missions. The series has expanded into light novels, stage plays, and various types of merchandise and media such as a trading card game and numerous video games. It has been adapted into an anime television series produced by Bones. The first season aired in Japan from April to June 2016, followed by a second season from April to September 2017, then a third season from April to September 2018, a fourth season from October 2019 to April 2020, a fifth season from March to September 2021, and a sixth season, which premiered in October 2022. It has also received three animated films, titled My Hero Academia: Two Heroes, My Hero Academia: Heroes Rising, and My Hero Academia: World Heroes' Mission, respectively. Additionally, it has developed eight original video animations (OVAs), each bundled with a limited edition in numerous volumes of the manga. There are plans for a live-action film by Legendary Entertainment.

In North America, the manga series has been licensed by Viz Media, who published the first volume in August 2015. It was released simultaneously in their digital Weekly Shonen Jump magazine. Shueisha began to simulpublish the series in English on Manga Plus online platform. The anime series has been licensed for streaming services, the home and broadcast release, and the merchandise rights by Crunchyroll. The English dub premiered on Adult Swim's Toonami programming block in May 2018.

My Hero Academia has become a large commercial success, appearing on The New York Times bestseller list several times. By February 2023, the manga had over 85 million copies in circulation including sales of spin-offs, making it one of the best-selling manga series of all time. Critical reception has also been positive with reviewers praising the manga for its art, characters, storytelling, action sequences and the use of pop culture references to Western superhero comics; the anime series has received additional praise for its animation, music, pacing, action sequences and voice performances in both Japanese and English. The manga and anime have both won several awards, including the Sugoi Japan Award and Harvey Award for Best Manga, and received two nominations for Anime of the Year at the Crunchyroll Anime Awards.

Synopsis

Setting
The story of My Hero Academia is set in a world where currently most of the human population has gained the ability to develop superpowers called , which occur in children within the age of four: it is estimated that around 80% of the world population has a Quirk. There are an endless number of Quirks, and it is extremely unlikely to find two people who have the exact same power, unless they are closely related. Among the Quirk-enhanced individuals, a few of them earn the title of Heroes, who cooperate with the authorities in rescue operations and apprehending criminals who abuse their powers, commonly known as Villains. Most heroes are popular based on their rankings, with higher ranking heroes receiving more popularity and public appeal, although it isn't uncommon for rookie heroes to gain such popularity as well.

While the act of vigilantism is inherently illegal, the vigilantes themselves represent a gray line in the eyes of the law. The Hero Public Safety Commission originally enlisted vigilantes to do their dirty work until they became too organized for the vigilantes to properly deal with, so they abandoned the idea and instead focused on recruiting Pro Heroes to handle the job. There are people who considered wearing costumes, since they don't have access to support companies like heroes do, they made out of regular clothes or anything they can get ahold of.

There are two types of internships that offer the opportunity to become a Pro Hero. The first type is the Hero Agency Internships in which sometimes, the Pro Heroes can send a request to the students whom wish to work under them, such as in the aftermath of the Sports Festival. It involves a student merely shadowing a Pro Hero, listening to their advice and watching them in action for an entire week. Since the students are unlicensed, they cannot legally work as heroes. And the second type is the Hero Work-Study where a student acquires a Hero License after passing the Provisional Hero License Exam. They are treated as real sidekicks, which allows them to participate in relief efforts during emergency situations. This also allows them to gain real experience and can help them get noticed by other Pro Heroes who might hire them as full-time sidekicks once they graduate.

Plot

Izuku Midoriya is a young man who dreams of becoming a Hero despite being bullied by his violent childhood friend Katsuki Bakugo for lacking a Quirk. After having a few encounters with his idol, All Might, who is Japan's greatest hero, Izuku is chosen by All Might to inherit his Quirk "One For All" (which gives him the ability to endlessly stockpile his raw power) and become his successor, as All Might was severely injured by his arch-nemesis All For One (whose Quirk allows him to steal other Quirks for his use and pass them over to others at his will) and does not have much time left to live. Izuku begins attending the U.A. High School for heroes in training alongside Bakugo and his friends from Class 1-A while keeping his connection with All Might a secret. During the course of the school year, Izuku and his friends work hard to improve themselves and have a few encounters with the League of Villains led by All For One's apprentice Tomura Shigaraki, who desires to kill All Might as part of their plan to take over the world. During one of these encounters, All Might and All For One have one last fight, which ends with All For One defeated and imprisoned, and All Might, having exhausted the last of One For All's power in himself, forced to retire.

After passing the exam to obtain a Provisional Hero License, Izuku begins working as an intern with All Might's former sidekick, Sir Nighteye. Sir Nighteye believes that Izuku is not worthy of inheriting One For All, but his opinion changes after Izuku helps take down the Shie Hassaikai, a gang of Quirk-enhanced yakuza and their leader Overhaul while rescuing a girl named Eri whose Quirk was being used to create a weapon that erases people's Quirks, despite Sir Nighteye (whose Quirk gives him the power to predict the future) was foretold that Izuku would die in the occasion. However, Sir Nighteye is mortally wounded instead but passes away certain that Izuku can live up to All Might's legacy. Izuku then continues his internship under the hero Endeavor, who assumed All Might's position as Japan's top hero following his retirement, along with Bakugo and Endeavor's son, Shoto Todoroki and awakens in himself a Quirk that belonged to one of All Might's predecessors, discovering that he can eventually obtain all the Quirks of the previous users of One For All as well.

Meanwhile, the League of Villains grows stronger after Shigaraki gathers more followers and defeats another villain group, the Meta Liberation Army led by Re-Destro, leading to both organizations merge into the Paranormal Liberation Front under his leadership. To counter this new threat, the Pro and Training Heroes join together in a massive operation to arrest them, but despite having several wounded and casualties, they fail to capture most of the League, including Shigaraki, who inherits All For One's Quirk and is possessed by him. In the following months, Shigaraki's group gain momentum by releasing thousands of imprisoned Villains which makes Japan descend into chaos and anarchy. Izuku, knowing that he is Shigaraki and All For One's primary target, decides that it's too dangerous for his friends and family to have him around and flees from U.A., leaving behind some letters to the others revealing all the truth.

Six months later, Izuku reappears, having unlocked most of his predecessors' Quirks and reunites with his classmates, who convince him to return to U.A., which was turned into a refugee camp for the students' families and other civilians who fled from the Villains. With Shigaraki's assimilation by All For One nearly complete, America's No. 1 Pro Hero, Star and Stripe, arrives to fight him by All Might's request. However, Shigaraki manages to kill her and steal her Quirk instead but before dying, she manages to use her power to delay the assimilation process, giving the Heroes some time to devise a plan. A few days later, the heroes begin their final battle against the League of Villains, managing to separate Shigaraki from his subordinates to give Izuku (who fully awakened the power of One For All and his predecessors) the chance to fight him in a duel.

Production

Development
Horikoshi stated that after his previous series Barrage was canceled after just two volumes, he was sad and out of ideas. In order to get more ideas, he revisited a one-shot he previously published in Akamaru Jump, titled . This would end up being the basis for the series. Horikoshi was also a big fan of American films and comics, like Spider-Man directed by Sam Raimi, Star Wars, and X-Men, which he used for inspiration. Horikoshi cites Masashi Kishimoto's Naruto as being the main influence for his art, specifically stating it gave him a love for drawing hands. Horikoshi has also cited Dragon Ball, Ultraman, and Kamen Rider as sources of inspiration.

Hitoshi Koike, the editor of My Hero Academia, explains that the author already had his general concept in mind about the manga and just as written in various places such as the comic's covers, there were many rejected story patterns that were changed and Horikoshi dismissed the idea on his own. He also stated that the author yearned to draw in his inspiration. He and Horikoshi had worked on concepts about their characters' designs while finishing the storyboards that draw the scenes in the series. He felt excited about the design despite not knowing the contents like in characters that were fascinating; for example, the series antagonist Tomura Shigaraki.

Kengo Monji, the second editor of the manga, said that the series' storyboards for the first chapter he took over as the new editor were still in progress, which it had not yet published into the magazine. He also stating that the series' author had a difficult time to work on their chapters, but the more important is to earn the best in working the series. He thinks that the good mix of elements that made it interesting, which made an idea by mixing the flair of Japan's shōnen manga with "heroes", a concept that everyone understands. He compliments about Horikoshi's drawing where the style that comes from the cartoon elements, and it makes the readers stunning to how cool is the art made.

Conclusion
Horikoshi originally stating that the manga will not be ending longer as One Piece because he does not have a stamina to it, instead he would like to keep it concise or shorter compare to the other shōnen manga series. In April 2021, Horikoshi stated that he had planned that the manga would end where it has been much longer than expected, but it is still leading toward the ending that had "decided" upon since before the series began. In December 2021, Horikoshi stated during the interview at the Jump Festa '22 event that "if things go smoothly, the manga will meet its goal in one year. If it doesn't go smoothly, I think [Izuku's voice actor] Yamashita will be reading out the exact same letter from me at next year's Jump Festa". He also teased that Katsuki Bakugo will soon get his "big scene" so that people who both love and hate the character can look forward to it. In May 2022, the manga's author has a very bittersweet message announced from the 34th volume of the manga. He said: "I feel like I can finally see the goal in sight. It's a rather strange feeling getting to this point. In the past, I would just be drawing without a single care [for the future], but now I wonder just how many more times can I draw these characters? Change is scary as you grow older. Well, I really shouldn't dwell on that! Until next volume then!". In October 2022, Horikoshi decides to reconsider the statement he said during the Jump Festa '22 event. Instead, he wants to take longer to complete the manga's final arc than expected.

Themes and analysis
Horikoshi has stated that the main theme he focuses on is "what makes a hero". He also stated that he likes stories with bad endings, as well as horror stories. However, he finds these difficult to draw since his mood when he draws is the same in the story. In order to combat this, he puts in more silly-looking characters like Fat Gum, in order to keep the mood up. While it has dark stories to be drawn in his own tension, Horikoshi adding that the fight scene of Fat Gum and Eijiro Kirishima against a villain during the Hero Work-Studies, was filled with passion.

Publication

Main series

My Hero Academia is written and illustrated by Kōhei Horikoshi. The series began its serialization in Shueisha's shōnen manga magazine Weekly Shōnen Jump on July 7, 2014. Shueisha has collected its chapters into individual tankōbon volumes. The first volume was released on November 4, 2014. As of February 3, 2023, thirty-seven volumes have been released. The manga entered its final act in chapter 306, which was released on March 21, 2021.

The series is licensed for English-language release in North America by Viz Media, who published the first volume on August 4, 2015. As the series is published in Japan, it is also released simultaneously in English digitally by Viz Media's Weekly Shonen Jump and later its website. Shueisha began to simulpublish the series in English on the website and app Manga Plus in January 2019.

Spin-offs

A spin-off series entitled My Hero Academia: Smash!! by Hirofumi Neda started in the Shōnen Jump+ digital app on November 9, 2015, and finished on November 6, 2017. Its chapters were collected in five tankōbon volumes. In November 2018, during their panel at Anime NYC, Viz Media announced that they have licensed the manga. The first volume was released in North America on August 6, 2019. A second spin-off series, My Hero Academia: Vigilantes, began being published biweekly on the Shōnen Jump+ website and app in 2017. The series began its serialization on August 20, 2016, and ended on May 28, 2022. The series is licensed for the English-language release in North America by Viz Media. The first volume was released in North America on July 3, 2018. A third spin-off series, My Hero Academia: Team-Up Missions by Yōkō Akiyama, began serialization in Saikyō Jump on August 2, 2019, with a prologue chapter debuting in Jump GIGA on July 25, 2019. The series is also licensed for the English-language release in North America by Viz Media. The first volume was released in North America on March 2, 2021.

The first two of the series' films have been adapted into one-volume manga series. Both were published by Homesha. A 15-page one-shot spin-off manga illustrated by Yōkō Akiyama centered on Melissa, titled , was published in the 35th issue of Shueisha's Weekly Shōnen Jump on July 30, 2018. A one-shot spin-off manga that serves as a prequel to the first film written and illustrated by Kōhei Horikoshi centered on All Might's past and the featured character Nana Shimura, titled , was given to the first million moviegoers on August 3, 2018. A ten-page manga was included in the  book, containing a "character description and analysis collection" of characters in the film, and a "secret dialogue" between Horikoshi and One Piece creator Eiichiro Oda. It was later published in English by Viz Media in September 2018.

, a two-chapter manga spin-off illustrated by Akiyama, was published in Shueisha's Weekly Shōnen Jump on December 16 and 23, 2019. It centered on Izuku Midoriya and Katsuki Bakugo during their second year in middle school. A one-shot spin-off manga that serves as a prequel to the second film written and illustrated by Horikoshi centered on Nine, titled , was also given to the first million theatergoers on December 20, 2019. A nine-page manga was included in the  book, containing an extended interview with Horikoshi, character designs and sketches. A manga chapter was later published in English by Viz Media in March 2020.

A 17-page special one-shot chapter written and illustrated by Akiyama, titled , was published in Weekly Shōnen Jump on August 2, 2021. It centered on Endeavor and his trainees Deku, Bakugo and Shoto during their Hero Work-Studies at the Endeavor Agency. An 80-page manga booklet, titled , includes a nine-page one-shot manga that serves as a prequel to the third film centered on Endeavor Agency trainees and the featured character Hawks, titled  as well as the roundtable interview with past and present manga editors, costume and character designs, and an interview with Horikoshi. It was given to the My Hero Academia: World Heroes' Mission theatergoers who viewed the film in Japan on August 6, 2021. The manga volume had a limited print run of one million copies. In October 2021, a 76-page booklet featuring a specialty manga, was also given to the theatergoers who saw it on the opening weekend in the United States.

Related media

Anime

On October 29, 2015, the series' official website announced that the manga would receive an anime television series adaptation produced by Bones. The anime is directed by Kenji Nagasaki, written by Yōsuke Kuroda, and featured character designs by Yoshihiko Umakoshi who also served as the chief animation director. The anime stars Marina Inoue as Momo Yaoyorozu, Yoshimasa Hosoya as Fumikage Tokoyami, Daiki Yamashita as Izuku Midoriya, Kenta Miyake as All Might, Nobuhiko Okamoto as Katsuki Bakugō, Ayane Sakura as Ochako Uraraka, Kaito Ishikawa as Tenya Iida, Aoi Yūki as Tsuyu Asui, and Ryō Hirohashi as Minoru Mineta. The series aired from April 3 to June 26, 2016, on TBS, MBS and other Japan News Network stations in the 'Nichigo' time slot at 5 P.M. on Sundays in Japan. FunimationNow, Crunchyroll and Hulu are streaming the series outside of Asia.

A second season was announced in the Weekly Shōnen Jump magazine's 30th issue of 2016. The second season aired from April 1 to September 30, 2017, on NTV and ytv. The staff and cast from the first season returning to reprise their roles. A third season was announced in the 44th issue of Weekly Shōnen Jump magazine of 2017. The third season aired from April 7 to September 29, 2018. FunimationNow is streaming the season in Simuldub, while Crunchyroll and Hulu are simulcasting outside of Asia as it airs. A fourth season was announced in the final episode of season three, which released on September 29, 2018. On December 19, 2018, the series' official website confirmed a release date of October 12, 2019, along with a key visual. Funimation premiered the first episode of the fourth season at Anime Expo on July 6, 2019, with the English dub. Kenji Nagasaki served as chief director of the fourth season, with Masahiro Mukai as director.

A fifth season was announced at the end of the final episode of season four. The fifth season aired from March 27 to September 25, 2021. Funimation launched on its service on April 10, 2021, with an English dub. Unlike the previous seasons, Medialink licensed the series in Southeast Asia and South Asia. The season is also streaming on Netflix, Viu, Bilibili, WeTV, iQIYI, meWATCH, and other regional streaming services. A sixth season was announced at the end of the fifth season's final episode. On July 24, 2022, the Hero Fes event confirmed a release date of October 1, 2022, with a new visual was revealed. The season will run for two consecutive cours. Crunchyroll has licensed the season outside of Asia and is streaming it along with the English dub two weeks after the airing. However, the English dub of episode 129 was delayed due to inclement weather delays in the Dallas area where the series is dubbed.

OVAs and ONAs

An original video animation (OVA) based on the anime series was shown at the Jump Festa '16 event on November 27, 2016. Titled "Save! Rescue Training!", it was bundled with the limited edition of the 13th volume of the manga, which released on April 4, 2017. It was later released on DVD releases alongside Black Clover and Food Wars!: Shokugeki no Soma bundled with the future volumes of their respective manga, as it was announced on Jump Special Anime Festa event. A second OVA, titled "Training of the Dead", bundled with a limited edition of the 14th volume of the manga, released on June 2, 2017. It focuses on a joint practice session between Izuku's class and the other hero department students at U.A. Academy. A third OVA, "All Might: Rising", was released on February 13, 2019. It was bundled with the first film's blu-ray set, and adapted its prequel manga. It was two minutes long.

A two-part original net animation (ONA) titled "Make It! Do-or-Die Survival Training", were released on August 16, 2020, with the returning staff and cast from season 4. Funimation streamed them simultaneously with the Japanese release. Another OVA was included with the "Plus Ultra" edition of My Hero Academia: World Heroes' Mission in Japan. Titled "Departure", it is based on the chapter "No.XXX Hawks: SOOTHE" from Vol. World Heroes manga, which released on February 16, 2022. It follows Midoriya, Bakugo, and Todoroki as they encounter Hawks in an airport terminal.

Two new OVA episodes, titled "HLB <Hero League Baseball>" and "Laugh! As If You Are in Hell", were announced on May 8 and June 3, 2022, respectively. The episodes were given screenings in Japan from June 16–19, 2022. Internationally, Crunchyroll premiered the episodes at Anime Expo on July 1, 2022. A worldwide streaming release premiered on August 1, 2022.

International release
In March 2016, Funimation announced they had licensed the international rights for streaming services, the home and broadcast release, and the merchandise rights. Universal Pictures UK distributed the first season in the United Kingdom and Ireland on behalf of Funimation, with Sony Pictures UK distributing the second season for Funimation, and Manga Entertainment distributing subsequent seasons for Funimation. In Australia and New Zealand, Universal Sony Pictures Home Entertainment distributed the first two seasons, on behalf of Funimation, with Madman Anime distributing season 3 onwards, in partnership with Funimation. On April 19, 2018, Funimation announced that the series would air on Adult Swim's Toonami block starting on May 5, 2018. Medialink licensed the series in Southeast Asia. They aired it simultaneously on Animax Asia.

Music
The music of the series is composed by Yuki Hayashi. The series uses twenty-two different songs for credits music: eleven opening themes and eleven ending themes. The opening theme is "The Day", performed by Porno Graffitti, while the ending theme is "Heroes", performed by Brian the Sun for 13 episodes in the first season.

Chrissy Costanza performs the insert songs "Each Goal" in episode 19 and "Hero too" in episode 23.

The first season's soundtrack album was released on July 13, 2016, with 35 tracks including several background sounds, under the Toho Animation Records label. The second season's two-disc soundtrack album was released on September 6, 2017, with 23 tracks each. The third season and theatrical film's two-disc soundtrack album were released on July 18, 2018, with 67 tracks overall. , which contains 32 tracks selected in between the first and third season, released on August 21, 2019. The fourth season's soundtrack album was released on March 25, 2020, with 18 tracks. It includes the song "Might" by Makayla Phillips, and "Each Goal" and "Hero too" by Chrissy Costanza as well as the instrumental version songs. The fifth season's soundtrack album which contains 19 tracks, released in Japan by Toho Animation Records on September 26, 2021, and in the United States by Milan Records on CD and vinyl records on January 26, 2022. Anime Limited released the soundtrack digitally which contains a two-LP set in the United Kingdom and Ireland on June 17, 2022.

 compilation album was released on January 26, 2022. The CD album contains 27 tracks from the fourth and fifth season, alongside the series' second and third film.  two-disc compilation album was released on March 15, 2023, with 52 tracks combined. The first disc has 20 tracks contained from the sixth season, while the second disc has 32 remastered versions of tracks contained from the fifth season and the series' third film. In November 2021, a concert event titled My Hero Academia Official Live Concert was held at the Jacob K. Javits Convention Center in Manhattan, which featured a rock band, orchestral music and some iconic tracks including the song "Hero too", performed by the series' composer.

Light novels
A light novel series titled , written by Anri Yoshi, has been released by Shueisha under its Jump J-Books imprint. It centers on Izuku Midoriya and his classmates of U.A. High in everyday school lives. It also features the main story events that covers off-screen. The first volume was released on April 4, 2016. As of October 4, 2021, six volumes have been published. In North America, it has been licensed in English by Viz Media. The first volume was published on April 2, 2019. As of January 24, 2023, six volumes have been published.

Light novels based on the three anime films were also released. A light novel adaptation based on the first film, written by Anri Yoshi, was published by Shueisha under Jump J-Books imprint on August 3, 2018. It centered on Izuku and All Might when they visit Melissa in I-Island. A light novel adaptation of the series' second film, centered on Midoriya and Bakugo, was published on December 20, 2019. A light novel of the third film, was published on August 6, 2021.

Theatrical films

Anime

An anime film was announced in December 2017 and features an original story set after the manga's "Final Exam" arc. Titled My Hero Academia: Two Heroes, the film had its world premiere at Anime Expo in Los Angeles on July 5, 2018, and the Japanese theatrical release began screening on August 3, 2018, with the staff and cast from the anime series returning to reprise their roles. The film has grossed over $33 million worldwide, and ended its theatrical run with $5.8 million to become the tenth-highest-grossing animated film in the United States and Canada at that time.

On March 23, 2019, it was announced that a second animated film for the series was in production. On July 7, 2019, the official Twitter account for My Hero Academia revealed the title as My Hero Academia: Heroes Rising, and the film was released in Japan on December 20, 2019. The film takes place after the manga's "Meta Liberation Army" arc. It has elements to its story that were once going to be used by Kōhei Horikoshi as a finale to the series. It was released in North America on February 26, 2020. The film has grossed over $29 million worldwide, and surpassed My Hero Academia: Two Heroes during its ninth weekend in the domestic gross.

On November 29, 2020, it was announced that a third animated film for the series was in production, and is scheduled for release in third quarter of 2021. The second film of the franchise was intended to be the last in the series until images of the third film appeared online. The staff and cast from the previous two films are returning to reprise their roles. In the first episode of the series' fifth season, the film was revealed to be titled My Hero Academia: World Heroes' Mission. The film was released in Japan on August 6, 2021, and it began screening in the United States and Canada on October 29, 2021. The film has grossed over $47 million worldwide, and became the tenth highest-grossing domestic film of 2021 in Japan.

Live-action
In October 2018, Legendary Entertainment acquired the rights to produce a live-action adaptation of the series. In August 2021, it was revealed to be directed by Shinsuke Sato, with Alex Garcia and Jay Ashenfelter overseeing the adaptation, and Ryosuke Yoritomi representing the manga publisher Shueisha. Toho will distribute the film in Japan. On December 12, 2022, Netflix announced that they had acquired the rights to the film with Joby Harold writing the screenplay for the adaptation.

Video games

Console games

A video game based on the anime, was announced in November 2015. The game was developed by Dimps and published by Bandai Namco Entertainment for the Nintendo 3DS handheld game console, where it released in Japan on May 19, 2016.

My Hero Academia has also received three video games developed by Byking and published by Bandai Namco Entertainment. The first, titled , was released for PlayStation 4, Nintendo Switch, Windows, and Xbox One on October 26, 2018. The game has sold over 500,000 units worldwide by January 2019. A sequel, was released on Nintendo Switch, PlayStation 4, Windows, and Xbox One on March 12, 2020 in Japan and worldwide in the following day. The third, a free-to-play battle royale action game titled  was announced in January 2022. It will be released on Nintendo Switch, PlayStation 4, Windows, Xbox One, and Xbox Series X/S.

Mobile games
Two mobile games have been released for iOS and Android.

Crossovers
Izuku Midoriya, All Might, Katsuki Bakugo, and Shoto Todoroki appeared as playable characters in the 2018 crossover fighting game Jump Force. A crossover event with the online video game Fortnite Battle Royale occurred from December 16–29, 2022 during 'Chapter 4 Season 1'. Izuku Midoriya, Katsuki Bakugo, Ochaco Uraraka, and All Might appeared as cosmetic outfits for players to purchase. Additionally, an in-game ability called "Deku's Smash" was introduced.

Stage plays
My Hero Academia: The "Ultra" Stage, a stage play adaptation, was first announced in 2018 and ran at The Galaxy Theatre in Tokyo from April 12–21, and then at the Sankei Hall Breeze in Osaka from April 26–29, 2019. The play was directed by Tsuneyasu Motoyoshi, written by Hideyuki Nishimori, and choreographed by Umebō. Shunsuke Wada composed the music. The cast includes Shin Tamura as Izuku Midoriya, Ryōta Kobayashi as Katsuki Bakugo, Yume Takuchi as Ochaco Uraraka, Hiroki Ino as Tenya Iida, and Ryō Kitamura as Shoto Todoroki.

A second stage play adaptation titled My Hero Academia: The "Ultra" Stage: A True Hero, was scheduled to run at the Shingawa Prince Hotel Stellar Ball in Tokyo from March 6–22, and at the Umeda Arts Theater Drama City in Osaka from March 27–April 5, 2020, with the cast and staff returning. A concert event titled My Hero Academia: The "Ultra" Live will be held in July 2020. However, due to the COVID-19 pandemic, My Hero Academia: The "Ultra" Stage: A True Heros original run was canceled and postponed to July 2020, where a complete version titled My Hero Academia: The "Ultra" Stage: A True Hero Plus Stage Ver. will run instead while My Hero Academia: The "Ultra" Live is postponed to a later date. After one staff member contracted COVID-19, the production committee announced that My Hero Academia: The "Ultra" Stage: A True Hero would instead be live-streamed; however, the play was delayed again after another staff member contracted COVID-19. The My Hero Academia: The "Ultra" Stage: A True Hero Plus Stage Ver. stage play was announced for a new run in 2021, which held at Tokyo Dome City Hall from December 3–12 and at Tokyo Gekijō from December 24–26.

A third stage play adaptation titled My Hero Academia The "Ultra" Stage: The Symbol of Peace was announced on December 26, 2021, and is scheduled to run in 3 cities from April to May. It will run in Kanagawa on April 9–10, in Osaka on April 22–24, and in Tokyo from April 29–May 8, 2022. However, due to actor's injury during the afternoon performance of the play on Saturday, the production committee is decided to canceled the performances while My Hero Academia The "Ultra" Stage: The Symbol of Peace is also announced to be postponed to a later date for the remaining performances in Tokyo.

A fourth stage play adaptation titled My Hero Academia: The "Ultra" Stage: The Best Hero, was announced at the Jump Festa '23 event in December 2022. It is scheduled to run in Tokyo from April 29 to May 7, in Kobe from May 12–14, and again in Tokyo from May 19–21, 2023.

Art and guidebooks
The My Hero Academia art book and three guidebooks have been published and released by Sheuisha. An art book titled , was released on May 7, 2016.

The first guidebook titled  which features the character profiles, stats, Quirks, trivia facts, concept art, information on the manga, special omake chapters focused on certain characters, and a conversation with anime character designer Yoshihiko Umakoshi, was published on May 2, 2016. Accompanying the anime, the guidebook titled  designed by Yoshihiko Umakoshi which features several questionnaires written by the anime's cast members and a round-table discussion full of dialogue, was published on September 4, 2017. The third guidebook titled  which features exclusive information about years of the series' serialization, characters' origins and motivations, an interview and an in-depth conversation between Horikoshi and Bleach author Tite Kubo, was published on October 4, 2019.

Other media
A drama CD titled  bundled with a limited edition of the seventh volume of the manga, released before the anime. Kōhei Horikoshi provides the original story and supervised the project, and the script is written by Yōsuke Kuroda who also wrote for the anime series.

A trading card game, was announced at the Jump Festa '16 event. The game was developed and published by Tomy, and released in Japan on April 23, 2016. An arcade card game titled  was released for Android and iOS devices on April 28, 2016. The game lets players collect hero card and take part in 3v3 battles.

An interactive puzzle-solving event called "Heroes Dead End Program" was held in Tokyo, Osaka, and Nagoya on July 29 and 30, 2017. Fans of the series would be able to solve various puzzles and ciphers as students at the Hero Academy, manifest Quirks, and fight Villains. A hot spring theme park on Odaiba collaborated with the anime for a promotion, which ran from September 1 to October 1, 2017 at Oedo Onsen Monogatari. A stamp rally offered original goods during the collaboration. An attraction with games inspired by Japanese temple festivals was held. People who attend the event would be able to purchase merchandise with the collaboration's special illustrations and food with bonus items. An exhibit of the series ran in Tokyo's Ikebukuro Sunshine City from September 30 to October 8, 2018. The exhibit is separated into seven zones which covers the different part of the anime's story.

The anime has also collaborating several companies for merchandise and products such as Sanrio, Tokyu Hands, Clorets, Axe, and many others. The numerous My Hero Academia-themed cafés has had collaborating for a limited time as well. Most notably in the fall festival theme, which opened from October 12 to November 24, 2019 at the Sega Ikebukuro GiGO in Tokyo. The restaurants featured decorations of artwork from the series, and served food or dessert menu connected to My Hero Academia characters or items. All Might made a cameo in the ninth chapter of the Deadpool: Samurai manga, showing that he save Deadpool while uttering his trademark phrase "I am here".

An art exhibition of the series titled "My Hero Academia Drawing Smash", ran in Tokyo's Mori Arts Center Gallery from April 23 to June 27, 2021. The exhibition displayed numerous artworks drawn by Kōhei Horikoshi, and also sold foods and drinks that draw references to the My Hero Academia characters. It also ran in Grand Front Osaka from July 16 to September 5, 2021. In October 2022, Crunchyroll and BoxLunch announced their merchandise collaboration for the series' photo experience spots alongside Jujutsu Kaisen, in select stores in the United States. Fans can take the pictures with the main characters featuring Izuku Midoriya, Katsuki Bakugo, and Ochaco Uraraka in the background through 11 locations. An all-out war themed exhibition from the anime's sixth season, will run at Osaka's Namba SkyO Convention Hall from April 26 to May 10, and at Tokyo Dome City Gallery AaMo from May 27 to June 18, 2023. The exhibition will also be held in Hokkaido, Aichi, and Fukuoka in the later dates.

Reception

Popularity
The story has been noted to take inspiration from elements in superhero comics, such as the aesthetics of its characters, and due to the popularity of the series, characters of My Hero Academia were used to promote the Marvel Studios film Avengers: Infinity War. Before the anime adaptation's premiere, Narutos creator Masashi Kishimoto praised Kōhei Horikoshi's work, believing it would be a success overseas. One Piece creator, Eiichiro Oda, also praised the series. The anime was popular with Japanese readers of Charapedia, who voted it the fourth best anime show of Q2 2017. The cosplayers as characters also became popular especially in Japan, where a poll ranked ninth in 2017. According to the UK retailer Zavvi where they conducted the results by searching for the most number of Instagram hashtags containing franchise names followed by the term "cosplay", My Hero Academia is the most popular franchise among cosplayers worldwide with 2,377,476 posts, ranking above the other well-known franchises such as DC Comics, Marvel, Disney, Star Wars, Naruto, Attack on Titan, Demon Slayer: Kimetsu no Yaiba, Pokémon and Sailor Moon. The retailer stating that this franchise demonstrates the "recent growth of anime" where the growth expected to continue as they spread love in the world about cosplaying any characters. In the other list where they conducted the number of hashtags containing character names, three My Hero Academia cosplaying characters were also placed in the top ten rankings; Deku ranked fifth with 224,429, Todoroki came in at seventh with 177,161, and Bakugou at ninth with 147,600 hashtag posts.

The anime had also received high TV ratings and has consistently ranked among the top ten animated shows in Japan, since the release of its second season onwards. In the United States, My Hero Academia is the 2nd most "in-demand" TV title in the last 60 days in 2020 according to Observer, a data that is used to track and measures popularity through social media, fan ratings, and piracy. It also had the record-high viewerships that has achieved worldwide, specifically in Japan. In April 2021, the fifth season of My Hero Academia holds a record for the most-watched premiere in any series on MyAnimeList, a popular anime site that aggregates reviews. It also topped the list with nearly 147,000 marking on its profile users, surpassing the other anime titles such as Attack on Titan: The Final Season, The Promised Neverland second season and Dr. Stone: Stone Wars. With the premiere of its sixth season on October 1, 2022, My Hero Academia earned a television rating of 3.9% and ranked as the fourth-most watched anime, ahead of One Piece in the average household viewership in Japan. The sixth season's fifth episode garnering over 3 million viewerships across 2.26 million households in the television, making it one of the biggest anime episodes to date. The sixth season also became as one of the "Most-Watched Anime in Japan", ranking 5th place overall on the list for December 2022.

My Hero Academia has gained a mainstream popularity towards not only for the young viewers in anime community, but also for the older fans worldwide. On Tumblr's 2020 Year in Review, which highlights the largest communities, fandoms, and trends on the platform throughout the year, the series ranked first on the Top Anime & Manga Shows category. The characters were also placed high in the rankings of Top Anime & Manga Characters category, with 7 of the top 10 spots occupied the list. Izuku Midoriya ranked first which placed Katsuki Bakugo, Dabi, Shouta Aizawa, Hawks, Shoto Todoroki and Eijiro Kirishima on second, third, fifth, sixth, seventh and eighth place, respectively. My Hero Academia was also ranked ninth on Tumblr's Top 20 overall in the 2020 list, suggesting that its popularity on the platform far exceeds its competitors in the Top Anime & Manga category, of which none are included in the list. The series was #17 on the annual Twitter Japan's Trend Awards in 2021, based on the social network's top trending topics of the year.

In November 2020, where British-American late night talk show host John Oliver discussed about the results of the U.S. election, a reference of My Hero Academia appeared which shows a middle-aged dad chanting outside his teenage son's bedroom door. It shows a poster of the franchise's second film with a sign reading "Eat × Sleep Game Repeat," indicating very stereotypical teen male interests.

Manga
My Hero Academia ranked second on the "Nationwide Bookstore Employees' Recommended Comics of 2015" poll by Honya Club online bookstore. On Takarajimasha's Kono Manga ga Sugoi! ranking of top 20 manga for male readers, the series ranked fifth on the 2016 list. My Hero Academia ranked 26th on the 2015 "Book of the Year" list by Da Vinci magazine; it ranked 22nd on the 2016 list; 16th on the 2018 list; 37th on the 2019 list; 41st on the 2020 list; 34th on the 2021 list; and 22nd on the 2022 list. The manga won the Mandō Kobayashi Manga Grand Prix 2015, created by comedian and manga enthusiast Kendo Kobayashi, in which each year's winner is decided based on his personal taste. The series was chosen as one of the Best Manga at the Comic-Con International Best & Worst Manga in 2018 and 2019. Barnes & Noble named it on their list of "Our Favorite Manga of 2018". Cold Cobra of Anime UK News picked the series for his list of "best manga of 2010s". On TV Asahi's Manga Sōsenkyo 2021 poll, in which 150.000 people voted for their top 100 manga series, My Hero Academia ranked 16th. On a 2021 survey conducted by LINE Research asking Japanese high school students what manga series they are currently into, the series ranked second among boys.

Sales
My Hero Academia has been a largely commercial success since the manga's release; in 2014, the first volume reached seventh place on the weekly Oricon's manga chart with 71,575 copies sold. It sold out almost immediately on its first printing. Volume 2 reached sixth place, with 167,531 copies and, by January 18, 2015, had sold 205,179 copies. In April 2015, volume 3 reached eighth place with 254,111 copies, while volume 4 reached sixth with 259,137 in June, and volume 5 peaked at ninth place with 279,414 copies in August. By March 2017, the manga had over 10 million copies in circulation; it had over 13 million copies in circulation by February 2018; over 15 million copies in circulation by May 2018; over 16 million copies in circulation by August 2018; over 17 million copies in circulation by September 2018; over 20 million copies in circulation by December 2018. over 21 million copies in circulation by February 2019; over 26 million copies in circulation by December 2019; over 30 million copies in circulation by January 2021; over 50 million copies in circulation by April 2021, with 37 million being sold in Japan and the remaining 13 million in the rest of the world; over 65 million copies in circulation by January 2022, with 45 million being sold in Japan and the remaining 20 million elsewhere; and over 85 million copies in circulation by February 2023.

My Hero Academia was the sixth best-selling manga series in the first half of 2017, with over 2 million copies sold, while volumes 12 and 13 were some of the top 50 best-selling manga volumes. By the end of the year, it was the fourth best-selling manga series with over 5.8 million copies sold, while volumes 12–15 were among the 50 best-selling manga volumes. In 2018, the 17th volume of the manga had received an initial print run of 600,000 copies. It was the fifth best-selling manga in the first half of 2018 with over 2.5 million copies sold, while volumes 17 and 18 were the 13th and 17th best-selling manga volumes, respectively. The series was ranked sixth on Rakuten's Top 20 Best Selling Digital Manga of 2018. It was the second best-selling manga in 2018, behind One Piece, with over 6.7 million copies sold; volumes 17–20 were among the 50 best-selling manga volumes, having sold over 3 million copies combined. The 22nd volume topped the Oricon's ranking sales chart list in February 2019, with 576,148 copies sold. It was the fourth best-selling manga in the first half of 2019, with over 3.1 million copies sold; volumes 21–23 were among the 50 best-selling manga volumes of the year. It was the sixth best-selling manga in 2019, with over 5 million copies sold.  

The My Hero Academia franchise sales generated an estimated annual content revenue of ¥16 billion in Japan between 2016 and 2020. Along with One-Punch Man, it had an initial print run of 660,000 copies, with its 26th volume in 2020. It was the fifth best-selling manga in the first half of 2020, with 3,339,656 million copies sold. The series was ranked 12th on Rakuten's Top 20 Best Selling Digital Manga of 2020. It was the eighth best-selling manga series in 2020, with over 6 million copies sold. The 29th volume had an initial print run of 680,000 copies in 2021. It was the fifth best-selling manga in 2021 and 2022, with over 7 million and 5.3 million copies sold, respectively; volumes 33–35 were among the 30 best-selling manga volumes of 2022. The series was ranked eighth on Rakuten's Top 20 Best Selling Digital Manga of 2021, and ninth in 2022.

The North American manga sales chart has been higher since the release. The volumes of My Hero Academia appeared on The New York Times Manga Best Seller list for several weeks, with volume one debuted in August 2015 at fourth place. They were also ranked on NPD BookScan's monthly top 20 adult graphic novels list since August 2016. In Q4 2018, My Hero Academia is the best-selling manga franchise from ICv2. Several volumes of the manga were also ranked on The New York Times Graphic Books and Manga bestseller monthly list since November 2019. The volumes 1 and 26 ranked third and sixth, respectively, on Publishers Weekly's bestseller list in March 2021. Volume 28 also charted on the Publishers Weekly's bestseller list in September 2021, ranking fifth.

According to ICv2, My Hero Academia was the fifth best-selling manga franchise for Q4 2021 (September–December) in the United States. According to NPD BookScan, seven volumes of My Hero Academia were ranked among the top 20 highest-selling manga volumes in 2021. The first volume had over 1.2 million copies in circulation by 2022 and the franchise as a whole had 10 million copies in circulation in the United States.

Critical reception
Nick Creamer of Anime News Network gave the first volume a B. Creamer praised the art, describing it as "absolutely professional". He labeled that Horikoshi's art was "consistent and highly polished", but also stating that it was fast-paced and very sharply drawn. He also praised the plot and characters, saying that despite the fact it felt like a typical Shōnen plot, it did well enough to still feel fresh and entertaining. He stated that the characters has a great energy and personality while bend and interact in general ways although it has dynamic angles and wild expressions, and felt distinctive while also sharing the stylistic similarities. He concludes that it's a "mature" work from a professional who clearly knows his craft, despite the story isn't beautiful. Isaac Akers from The Fandom Post ranked the second volume as a B+. He praised the art, saying that Horikoshi's character designs and strong art bolster the volume's ability to feel as if it does everything it does just because it likes doing it. He also compliments in how much Horikoshi likes drawing. He concluded that My Hero Academia was a difficult series to dislike, making it as the "real joy to read" by executing on the author's ideas and enough nerve and twist.

Sean Gaffney from A Case Suitable for Treatment referred to the art as "smooth" and complemented how it flows with the action. Gaffney also praised the story, characters and fight scenes, stating that the story flows nicely with each of their individual personalities, while the fight scenes look smooth and non-confusing. Manga Bookshelf praised the first volume for its art, saying that it demonstrated Horikoshi's skill very well, though criticizing it for having too much narration at some points. In the review between volumes 1 and 19, Michelle Smith from Soliloquy in Blue called the plot "very good", but also stated that the main reason she liked the series was the characters, specifically praising most of the main cast. However, she criticized the series for not giving some of the female characters enough spotlight despite praising for their varied in character design and personality.

In a review of the second volume, Leroy Douresseaux from Comic Book Bin also praised the story, specifically the way it tells comedy and drama. He also compared the series to the other superhero works like Tiger & Bunny and One-Punch Man, stating that My Hero Academia proves that "manga can do superhero comic books that are every bit as imaginative as American superhero comics." Marina Garrow from Anime Feminist praised the way the plot handles damsel-in-distress elements, especially when compared to other shōnen series, stating that the female characters are not the only characters that need saving, and when they do need saving, the situations are realistic and not overexaggerated.

Accolades

Anime
On the review aggregator website Rotten Tomatoes, the first season of  My Hero Academia holds an approval rating of 100% based on 9 reviews, with an average rating of 8.7/10. In Crunchyroll's inaugural The Anime Awards, Izuku Midoriya was awarded the "Hero of the Year" category while the anime series was nominated in six other categories including "Anime of the Year". At the 2nd Crunchyroll Anime Awards in 2018, the second season of the anime won seven out of ten nominations: Best Action, Best Animation, Best Opening ("Peace Sign"), Best Girl (Ochaco Uraraka), Best Boy (Shoto Todoroki), Best Villain (Stain), and second Best Hero category (Izuku Midoriya); in addition to Industry Icon Award to Christopher Sabat for his role of All Might. The series ranked 14th in Tokyo Anime Award Festival in the Best 100 TV Anime 2017 category. It ranked first in a "mega poll" of the number of readers for Best Anime of 2017 and 2018 by Anime News Network. In January 2021, it was revealed that the anime series was the fourth most-watched anime series on Crunchyroll in 2020, being watched in 23 countries and territories, including North America, South and Central America, and Europe.

Sales
My Hero Academia sales was quite high, and has been successful in Japan since the release of the anime. The five volumes of the first season on Blu-ray and DVD were released in Japan, with each release appeared in Oricon's Animation Blu-ray and the Animation DVD disc ranking, respectively. The first Blu-ray edition of My Hero Academia was ranked fifth in the first week of Oricon's Blu-ray Disc ranking, while the first DVD edition ranked fourth with 2,184 copies. The second Blu-ray and DVD sets were also ranked, with the Blu-ray edition came in at sixth and DVD at fifth for a week. The third Blu-ray edition was ranked fourth with 1,700 copies, while the DVD release was eighth with 1,184 copies. The fourth Blu-ray and DVD collections were ranked fifth and fourth, respectively. The fifth Blu-ray and DVD release sale was ranked higher than the previous volumes, where the Blu-ray came in at third with 1,473 copies and the DVD ranked second with 1,068 copies in a week. Four volumes of the second season on Blu-ray and DVD also appeared in the Oricon's Animation Blu-ray and DVD disc ranking. The first Blu-ray edition was ranked seventh, while the DVD ranked fifth. The third Blu-ray edition was among the top 20 in Oricon's Animation Blu-ray disc ranking, while the DVD was 10th among the 30 Animation DVD rankings. The seventh Blu-ray and DVD were ranked eighth. The eighth Blu-ray and DVD sets were ranked fourth, respectively. The anime's second season opening song, "Peace Sign" by Kenshi Yonezu, topped the Billboard charts on the Billboard Japan Hot 100; it peaked at number 2 on the Oricon charts. By the end of 2017, the "Bootleg" soundtrack album including "Peace Sign", became the top-selling anime CD album on the Oricon's chart with 241,754 discs in sale.

In the first half of 2018, the "Bootleg" soundtrack was again the top-selling anime CD album on the Oricon's chart. Seven volumes of the third season on Blu-ray and DVD appeared in the Oricon's Animation Blu-ray and DVD disc ranking, respectively. The first Blu-ray edition was ranked ninth, while the DVD ranked 3rd. The second Blu-ray edition came in at sixth, while the DVD ranked fifth. The third Blu-ray edition ranked fourth, and the DVD ranked second. The fourth Blu-ray and DVD sets were ranked fifth and sixth, respectively. The fifth Blu-ray edition was ranked  third with 1,194 copies, while the DVD ranked second. The seventh Blu-ray and DVD editions were ranked ninth and sixth, respectively. The eighth Blu-ray and DVD collections were ranked fourth and third, respectively. The franchise's first film that contains a "Plus Ultra" edition in both Blu-ray and DVD were selling higher prior to the release in Japan. "Plus Ultra" sold 10,603 units which topped the charts on its release week, while the DVD sold 7,387 units which ranked second in its first week of release. The standard editions were also selling higher, in which the Blu-ray sold 1,279 units while the DVD sold 1,943 units on its first week of release. By the end of 2018, "Bootleg" became the top-selling anime CD album for the second consecutive year with the other compilation, LiSA BEST -Day- which includes an ending theme song of the second season, "Datte Atashi no Hero" by LiSA, ranked ninth on the Oricon's chart simultaneously.

Critical reception
Alex Osborn of IGN gave the first season a nine out of ten rating, praising it for its action, story, and characters, while criticizing its villains for being underdeveloped. Osborn also stating that "its excellent character design only elevates the memorable cast even further." He concluded that "the first season of My Hero Academia delivers thirteen episodes of fantastic action, elevated by a heartfelt story that's wrapped around a core cast of memorable and relatable characters." In a review for the second season, Osborn praised it as "truly something special", complimenting the animation, character developments, and the emotional weight of the season. He called it as "one of the best TV shows" he has ever watched. Tom Speelman of Polygon praised the anime for its animation, action and characters. Speelman also stating that compared to the other superhero teams like X-Men or Legion of Super-Heroes, My Hero Academias biggest asset is its huge cast, with even minor characters having a "fun look" or "interesting personality" for readers to latch onto. He noted that it has similarities to the other shows and comics like Teen Titans, Runaways or Young Justice, though its closest thematic analogue is the forgotten (but awesome) 2005 Disney film Sky High.

Chris Beveridge from The Fandom Post also praised the anime. He said that despite the fact its a long running series, it manages to not feel directionless and has several great moments. Nick Creamer from Anime News Network also praised the adaptation. He gave praise to the music and animation in the action scenes, while criticizing the sometimes-sluggish pacing and stating that the animation can be average at times. In his review of the second season, he gave it praise for the improvements made to both the pacing and animation. Sam Leach of Anime News Network highlighted the 49th episode where it is the final battle between All Might and All For One. Leach wrote: "It was unavoidable that this was going to be a beautiful episode. That bloodied-up All Might is striking in either form, and you can tell they pulled out all the stops in making the big hits as intense and crazy as possible. From a pacing perspective, I'm really pleased with how this Bakugo Rescue arc played out." He concluded: "This is My Hero Academias proudest moment in the spotlight. Not only does it continue to be the darling of modern Shonen Jump with one of the mostly perfectly tuned anime adaptations a long-running series has ever received, this is an accomplishment of storytelling across the board."

Both the original Japanese cast and the English dub received praise from critics. Osborn applauded the casting choices and overall voice work, adding that [Izuku's voice actor] Daiki Yamashita is a "perfect fit" in the Japanese dub, while the English voice actor Justin Briner described his performance as excellent and standout. Creamer rated both equally, stating that the dub cast of the major characters generally fits their roles very well, though criticizing some of the background characters. Andy Hanley from UK Anime Network concured, stating both casts had strong performances, however, they gave special praise to the dub cast, saying that each actor fits their roles very well. Speelman stating that both Japanese and English casts know exactly how to make these roles work. He noted that both Yamashita and Briner's voice as Izuku "nail the optimistic nerdiness and heroic attitude" with Briner "channeling a bit of Morty Smith for good measure". He also praised the voice performances of All Might, noting that Japanese voice actor Kenta Miyake "nails the goofy earnestness of the part", while English voice actor Christopher Sabat called him as essentially Superman which also described his voice character as a "great fit".

The anime series has been named as one of the best of the 2010s in several publications. Writing for Comic Book Resources, Sage Ashford ranked it fourth on his list, praising its character development that makes everyone understand and chose all of the U.A. High students in different reasons. Although he criticized that the series doesn't have anything "new", it executes the classic shonen tropes perfectly which results to be one of the most finely tuned battle shonen ever created. Ashford also described it as the best superhero anime of the decade, stating that "Horikoshi has created a universe which manages to keep the colorful costumes and inventive powers of superheroes, adding in the complexity necessary to explain how society would deal with everyone having superpowers, and at the same time keeping the earnestness and admirable characters necessary for a superhero universe to work. While it doesn't do much new, My Hero understands and executes every shonen trope perfectly, so it's no wonder it's one of the most popular series of the decade."

Paste ranked My Hero Academia among the top 50 anime of all time. In November 2019, Polygon named it as one of the best anime of the 2010s. Austen Goslin wrote that the show "feels like the evolution of the shonen. While the earlier days of action shonen often relegated plot as merely a bridge between two fights, My Hero elevates it to the main attraction." Crunchyroll listed it in their "Top 25 best anime of the 2010s". Joe Luster wrote: "Like the great shonen forefathers before it, My Hero Academia follows a winning formula, and it does so with an unforgettable cast of characters and a rogues gallery of villains that create stakes that feel genuinely high." In January 2020, IGN and Thrillist named it among the best anime series of the 2010s. Japan Web Magazine ranked the series 25th on its list of "30 Best Anime of All Time".

Accolades

Unit 731 controversy
In early 2020, the series caused a controversy in South Korea and China for a character's name allegedly referencing Unit 731, an infamous Imperial Japanese army unit known for vivisecting captured Chinese, Korean, and Russian individuals. In response, it has been removed from digital platforms in China, and the character's name was changed to no longer reference Unit 731. A day prior, both Weekly Shōnen Jump manga magazine publisher Shueisha and the manga's author Kōhei Horikoshi issued an individual apology statements on Twitter.

In the aftermath of the manga's removal from its services in China, the English-language news service Abacus reached out to bilibili and Tencent for its request. The former stated that the removal was "in accordance with China's policies" but declined to comment further, while the latter did not respond to Abacus' request for comment. The character's name was changed again by the digital version of Weekly Shōnen Jump following the backlash. Shueisha promised that "going forward, we intend to devote our energies toward deepening our understanding of a variety of historical and cultural matters." Both the publisher and manga's creator reiterated that the reference to war crimes within the character's name was wholly unintentional.

Notes

References

External links
  
  
  at Viz Media
 
 
 

 
2014 manga
2016 anime television series debuts
Adventure anime and manga
Anime series based on manga
Bones (studio)
Book censorship in China
Coming-of-age anime and manga 
Crunchyroll anime 
Crunchyroll Anime Awards winners
Harvey Award winners
Jump J-Books
Mainichi Broadcasting System original programming
Mass media franchises
Medialink
Musicals based on anime and manga
Nippon TV original programming
School life in anime and manga
Science fantasy anime and manga
Shueisha franchises
Shueisha manga
Shōnen manga
Superhero schools
Superheroes in anime and manga
Television censorship in China
Television shows written by Yōsuke Kuroda
Toho Animation
Toonami
Viz Media manga
Viz Media novels
Works banned in China
Yomiuri Telecasting Corporation original programming
Fiction about invisibility